Pet Grief is the second studio album by Swedish dream pop band The Radio Dept., released on 12 April 2006 through Labrador Records.

Critical reception

Pitchforks John Motley wrote, "The songs on Pet Grief are easy to fall in love with; the facile melodies and slick production eliminate any barriers to enjoyment. But the lack of challenge— few surprises, scant diversity— means you won't want to put the album on for repeat listens, even if you're never compelled to turn it off while it's playing. Radio Dept. could sacrifice a little polish for a few more rough edges." AllMusic critic K. Ross Hoffman thought only a handful of the tracks are comparable to "the remarkably consistent quality" of the band's debut, Lesser Matters (2004), further elaborating: "It may be that they were just more interested in album-length ambience than stand-alone pop this time around—a couple of brief, spacy instrumentals seem to suggest as much. In that sense the album must certainly be regarded as a success; it's a rich and evocative mood piece, and still eminently worth hearing. It's just a minor disappointment when a band so adept at bridging the style-substance divide decide to limit themselves to just one facet of their talents." Maddy Costa of The Guardian stated that "in the right mood, there is something shy and lovely about Pet Grief, ghosts of the C86 sound that make you want to grab a cardigan and sway."

Track listing

Personnel
Credits adapted from the liner notes of Pet Grief.

The Radio Dept.
 Johan Duncanson – vocals, guitar, keyboards, production, mixing
 Martin Larsson – guitar, bass guitar, keyboards, production, mixing
 Daniel Tjäder – keyboards

Additional personnel
 Per Blomgren – drums 
 Alan Duncanson – cover photo
 Göran Olsson – inside photo

Charts

References

2006 albums
The Radio Dept. albums
Labrador Records albums